US Post Office-St. Johnsville is a historic post office building located at St. Johnsville in Montgomery County, New York, United States. It was built in 1936, and is one of a number of post offices in New York State designed by the Office of the Supervising Architect of the Treasury Department under Louis A. Simon.  It is a one-story, symmetrical brick building on a stone watertable in the Colonial Revival style.  It features a copper clad gable roof with a square, flat topped cupola with a weathervane.  The interior features a 1940 mural by Jirayr H. Zorthian (1911-2004) titled "Early St. Johnsville Pioneers."

It was listed on the National Register of Historic Places in 1989.

References

St. Johnsville
Government buildings completed in 1936
Colonial Revival architecture in New York (state)
Buildings and structures in Montgomery County, New York
National Register of Historic Places in Montgomery County, New York